Astrid Anna Emilia Lindgren (14 November 1907 – 28 January 2002) was a Swedish writer of fiction and screenplays. She is best known for several children's book series, featuring Pippi Longstocking, Emil of Lönneberga, Karlsson-on-the-Roof, and the Six Bullerby Children (Children of Noisy Village in the US), and for the children's fantasy novels Mio, My Son, Ronia the Robber's Daughter, and The Brothers Lionheart. Lindgren worked on the Children's Literature Editorial Board at the Rabén & Sjögren publishing house in Stockholm and wrote more than 30 books for children. In January 2017, she was calculated to be the world's 18th most translated author, and the fourth most translated children's writer after Enid Blyton, Hans Christian Andersen and the Brothers Grimm. Lindgren has so far sold roughly 167 million books worldwide. In 1994, she was awarded the Right Livelihood Award for "her unique authorship dedicated to the rights of children and respect for their individuality."

Biography 

Astrid Lindgren grew up in Näs, near Vimmerby, Småland, Sweden, and many of her books are based on her family and childhood memories.

Lindgren was the daughter of Samuel August Ericsson (1875–1969) and Hanna Jonsson (1879–1961).

Upon finishing school, Lindgren took a job with a local newspaper in Vimmerby. She had a relationship with the chief editor, who was married but eventually proposed marriage in 1926 after she became pregnant. She declined and moved to the capital city of Stockholm, learning to become a typist and stenographer (she would later write most of her drafts in stenography). In due time, she gave birth to her son, Lars, in Copenhagen and left him in the care of a foster family.

Although poorly paid, she saved whatever she could and traveled as often as possible to Copenhagen to be with Lars, often just over a weekend, spending most of her time on the train back and forth. Eventually, she managed to bring Lars home, leaving him in the care of her parents until she could afford to raise him in Stockholm.

Since 1928 Lindgren worked as secretary at the Royal Automobile Club and by 1931 she married her boss, Sture Lindgren (1898–1952), who left his wife for her. Three years later, in 1934, Lindgren gave birth to her second child, Karin, who would become a translator. The character Pippi Longstocking was invented to amuse her daughter while she was ill in bed. Lindgren later related that Karin had suddenly said to her, "Tell me a story about Pippi Longstocking," and the tale was created in response to that request.

The family moved in 1941 to an apartment on Dalagatan, with a view over Vasaparken, where Lindgren remained until her death on 28 January 2002 at the age of 94 caused by a viral infection, having become blind and almost entirely deaf. Lindgren died in her home in central Stockholm. Her funeral took place in the Storkyrkan in Gamla stan. Among those attending were King Carl XVI Gustaf with Queen Silvia and others of the royal family, and Prime Minister Göran Persson. The ceremony was described as "the closest you can get to a state funeral."

Career 
Lindgren worked as a journalist and secretary before becoming a full-time author. She served as a secretary for the 1933 Swedish Summer Grand Prix.
In the early 1940s, she worked as a secretary for criminalist Harry Söderman; this experience has been cited as an inspiration for her fictional detective Bill Bergson.

In 1944 Lindgren won second prize in a competition held by the book publishing company Rabén & Sjögren, with the novel  (The Confidences of Britt-Marie). A year later she won first prize in the same competition with the chapter book  (Pippi Longstocking), which had been rejected by the book publishing company Bonniers. (Rabén & Sjögren published it with illustrations by Ingrid Vang Nyman, the latter's debut in Sweden.) Since then it has become one of the most beloved children's books in the world and has been translated into 60 languages. While Lindgren almost immediately became a much appreciated writer, the irreverent attitude towards adult authority that is a distinguishing characteristic of many of her characters has occasionally drawn the ire of some conservatives.

The women's magazine Damernas Värld sent Lindgren to the United States in 1948 to write short essays. Upon arrival she is said to have been upset by the discrimination against black Americans. A few years later she published the book Kati in America, a collection of short essays inspired by the trip.

(Sixteen books written by Lindgren made the Children's Book and Picture Book longlist, 1956–1975, but only Mio, My Son won a prize in its category.)

In 1958 Lindgren received the second Hans Christian Andersen Medal for Rasmus på luffen (Rasmus and the Vagabond), a 1956 novel developed from her screenplay and filmed in 1955. The biennial International Board on Books for Young People, now considered the highest lifetime recognition available to creators of children's books, soon came to be called the Little Nobel Prize. Prior to 1962 the Board cited a single book published during the preceding two years.

In 1995, she was awarded the Illis quorum by the Swedish government. On her 90th birthday, she was pronounced International Swede of the Year 1997 by Swedes in the World (SVIV), an association for Swedes living abroad.

In its entry on Scandinavian fantasy, The Encyclopedia of Fantasy named Lindgren the foremost Swedish contributor to modern children's fantasy. Its entry on Lindgren was: "Her niche in children's fantasy remains both secure and exalted. Her stories and images can never be forgotten."

Translations 
By 2012, Lindgren's books had been translated into 95 different languages and language variants. Further, the first chapter of Ronja the Robber's Daughter has been translated into Latin. Up until 1997 a total of 3,000 editions of her books had been issued internationally, and globally her books had sold a total of 165 million copies. Many of her books have been translated into English by the translator Joan Tate.

Politics 

In 1976, a scandal arose in Sweden when it was publicised that Lindgren's marginal tax rate had risen to 102 percent. This was to be known as the "Pomperipossa effect", from a story she published in Expressen on 3 March 1976, entitled Pomperipossa in Monismania, attacking the government and its taxation policies. It was a satirical allegory in response to the marginal tax rate Lindgren had incurred in 1976, which required self-employed individuals to pay both regular income tax and employers' deductions. In a stormy tax debate, she attracted criticism from Social Democrats and even from her own colleagues, and responded by raising the issue of the lack of women involved in the Social Democrats' campaign. In that year's general election, the Social Democratic government was voted out for the first time in 44 years, and the Lindgren tax debate was one of several controversies that may have contributed to the result. Another controversy involved Ingmar Bergman's farewell letter to Sweden, after charges had been made against him of tax evasion. Lindgren nevertheless remained a Social Democrat for the rest of her life.

In 1978, when she received the Peace Prize of the German Book Trade, Lindgren made a speech, Never Violence!. She spoke against corporal punishment of children. After that she teamed up with scientists, journalists and politicians to promote non-violent upbringing. In 1979, a law was introduced in Sweden prohibiting violence against children. Until then there was no such law anywhere in the world.

From 1985 to 1989, Lindgren wrote articles concerning animal protection and mass production in the Swedish magazines Expressen and Dagens Nyheter along with the veterinarian Kristina Forslund. They wanted to launch an awareness campaign to promote better animal treatment in factory farming. Eventually their activities led to a new law which was called Lex Lindgren and was presented to Lindgren on her 80th birthday. During that time it was the strictest law concerning animal welfare in the world. However, Lindgren and Forslund were unsatisfied with it. Not enough had been done and only minor changes occurred. The articles Forslund and Lindgren wrote were later published in the book Min ko vill ha roligt.

Lindgren was well known both for her support for children's and animal rights and for her opposition to corporal punishment and the EU. In 1994 she received the Right Livelihood Award, "For her commitment to justice, non-violence and understanding of minorities as well as her love and caring for nature."

Lindgren was also a member of the freedom of speech-promoting, anti-imperialist organization Folket i Bild/Kulturfront.

Honors and memorials 

In 1967, the publisher Rabén & Sjögren established an annual literary prize, the Astrid Lindgren Prize, to mark her 60th birthday. The prize—40,000 Swedish kronor—is awarded to a Swedish-language children's writer every year on Lindgren's birthday in November.

Following Lindgren's death, the government of Sweden instituted the Astrid Lindgren Memorial Award in her memory. The award is the world's largest monetary award for children's and youth literature, in the amount of five million Swedish kronor.

The collection of Lindgren's original manuscripts in Kungliga Biblioteket in Stockholm (the Royal Library) was placed on UNESCO's Memory of the World Register in 2005.

On 6 April 2011, Sweden's central bank Sveriges Riksbank announced that Lindgren's portrait would feature on the 20 kronor banknote, beginning in 2014–2015. In the run-up to the announcement of the persons who would feature on the new banknotes, Lindgren's name had been the one most often put forward in the public debate.

Asteroid Lindgren 
Asteroid 3204 Lindgren, discovered in 1978 by Soviet astronomer Nikolai Chernykh, was named after her. The name of the Swedish microsatellite Astrid 1, launched on 24 January 1995, was originally selected only as a common Swedish female name, but within a short time it was decided to name the instruments after characters in Lindgren's books: PIPPI (Prelude in Planetary Particle Imaging), EMIL (Electron Measurements – In-situ and Lightweight), and MIO (Miniature Imaging Optics).

Astrid's Wellspring 

In memory of Lindgren, a memorial sculpture was created next to her childhood home, named  ("Astrid's Wellspring" in English). It is situated at the spot where Lindgren first heard fairy tales. The sculpture consists of an artistic representation of a young person's head (1.37 m high), flattened on top, in the corner of a square pond, and, just above the water, a ring of rosehip thorn (with a single rosehip bud attached to it). The sculpture was initially slightly different in design and intended to be part of a fountain set in the city center, but the people of Vimmerby vehemently opposed the idea. Furthermore, Lindgren had stated that she never wanted to be represented as a statue. (However, there is a statue of Lindgren in the city center.) The memorial was sponsored by the culture council of Vimmerby.

Lindgren's childhood home is near the statue and open to the public. Just  from Astrid's Wellspring is a museum in her memory. The author is buried in Vimmerby where the Astrid Lindgren's World theme park is also located. The children's museum Junibacken, in Stockholm, was opened in June 1996 with the main theme of the permanent exhibition being devoted to Lindgren; at the heart of the museum is a theme train ride through the world of Lindgren's novels.

Works (selection)

Series 
 Bill Bergson series
 Bill Bergson, Master Detective (1946)
 Bill Bergson Lives Dangerously (1951)
 Bill Bergson and the White Rose Rescue (1954)
 Children's Everywhere series
 Noriko-San: girl of Japan (also known as: Eva Visits Noriko-San, Swedish: , 1956)
 Sia Lives on Kilimanjaro (1958)
 My Swedish Cousins (1959)
 Lilibet, circus child (1960)
 Marko Lives in Yugoslavia (1962)
 Dirk Lives in Holland (1963)
 Randi Lives in Norway (also known as: Gerda Lives in Norway, Swedish:  1965)
 Noy Lives in Thailand (1966)
 Matti Lives in Finland (1968)
 The Children on Troublemaker Street series
 The Children on Troublemaker Street (also known as: Lotta, Lotta Says No!, Mischievous Martens, Swedish: , 1956)
 Lotta on Troublemaker Street (also known as: Lotta Leaves Home, Lotta Makes a Mess, Swedish: , 1961)
 Lotta's Bike (also known as: Of Course Polly Can Ride a Bike, Swedish: , 1971)
 Lotta's Christmas Surprise (also known as: Of Course Polly Can Do Almost Anything, Swedish: , 1965
 Lotta's Easter Surprise (1990)
 Emil of Lönneberga series
 Emil in the Soup Tureen (also known as: Emil and the Great Escape, That Boy Emil!, Swedish: , 1963)
 Emil's Pranks (also known as: Emil and the Sneaky Rat, Emil Gets into Mischief, Swedish: , 1966)
 Emil and Piggy Beast (also known as: Emil and His Clever Pig, Swedish: , 1970)
 Emil's Little Sister (also known as: , 1984)
 Emil's Sticky Problem (also known as: , 1970)
 Karlsson-on-the-Roof series
 Karlsson-on-the-Roof (also known as: Karlson on the Roof, Swedish: , 1955)
 Karlson Flies Again (also known as: Karlsson-on-the-Roof is Sneaking Around Again, Swedish , 1962)
 The World's Best Karlson (1968)
 Kati series
 Kati in America (1951)
 Kati in Italy (1952)
 Kati in Paris (1953)
 Madicken series
 Mardie (also known as: Mischievous Meg, Swedish , 1960)
 Mardie to the Rescue (1976)
 The Runaway Sleigh Ride (1983)
 Peter & Lena series
 I Want a Brother or Sister (also known as: That's My Baby, Swedish: , 1971)
 I Want to Go to School Too (1971)
 Pippi Longstocking series
 Pippi Longstocking (1945)
 Pippi Goes On Board (also known as: Pippi Goes Aboard, Swedish: , 1946)
 Pippi in the South Seas (1948)
 Pippi's After-Christmas Party (1950)
 Pippi Longstocking in the Park (1945)
 Pippi Moves In! (1969)
 The Six Bullerby Children / The Children of Noisy Village series
 The Children of Noisy Village (also known as: Cherry Time at Bullerby, Swedish: , 1947)
 Happy Times in Noisy Village (1952)
 Christmas in Noisy Village (1963)
 Springtime in Noisy Village (1965)
 Children's Day in Bullerbu (also known as: A Day at Bullerby, 1967)
 The Tomten series
 The Tomten (1960)
 The Tomten and the Fox (1966)

Individual books 
 The Brothers Lionheart (1973)
 Brenda Brave Helps Grandmother (1958)
 A Calf for Christmas (1989)
 Christmas in the Stable (1961)
 The Day Adam Got Mad (also known as: Goran's Great Escape, The Day Adam Got Angry, Swedish: , 1991)
 The Dragon with Red Eyes (1985)
 The Ghost of Skinny Jack (1986)
 How Astrid Lindgren achieved enactment of the 1988 law protecting farm animals in Sweden (1990)
 I Don't Want to Go to Bed (1947)
 In the Land of Twilight (1994)
 Mio, My Son (also known as: Mio, My Mio, Swedish: , 1954)
 Mirabelle (2002)
 Most Beloved Sister (also known as: My Very Own Sister, Swedish: , 1973)
 My Nightingale Is Singing (1959)
 Never Violence (2018)
 Now That Night Is Near (2019)
 Rasmus and the Vagabond (also known as: Rasmus and the Tramp, Swedish: , 1956)
 Ronia the Robber's Daughter (1981)
 The Red Bird (1959)
 Scrap and the Pirates (also known as: Skrallan and the Pirates, Swedish: , 1967)
 Simon Small Moves In (1956)
 Samuel August from Sevedstorp and Hanna i Hult (also known as A love story, Swedish: , 1975)
 Seacrow Island (Vi på Saltkråkan, 1961)
 War Diaries, 1939–1945 (2015)

Plays 

In addition to her novels, short stories and picture books, Lindgren wrote some plays. Many of the plays were created in the 1940s and 1950s in collaboration with her friend Elsa Olenius, a pioneer in Swedish children's theater. Many of the stories were written exclusively for the theater. They have been translated into several languages, including Danish, Finnish and Romanian. Most of Lindgren's plays have not been translated into English.

 Kalle Blomkvist, Nisse Nöjd och Vicke på Vind
 Mästerdetektiven Kalle Blomkvist: För kasperteater två korta akter
 Jul hos Pippi Långstrump
 Serverat, Ers Majestät!
 En fästmö till låns
 Huvudsaken är att man är frisk
 Jag vill inte vara präktig
 Snövit
 Pippi Långstrumps liv och leverne

Filmography 

This is a chronological list of feature films based on stories by Lindgren. There are live-action films as well as animated features. The most films were made in Sweden, followed by Russia. Some are international coproductions.
 Mästerdetektiven Blomkvist (1947) – director: Rolf Husberg
 Pippi Långstrump (1949) – director: Per Gunwall
 Mästerdetektiven och Rasmus (1953) – director: Rolf Husberg
 Luffaren och Rasmus (1955) – director: Rolf Husberg
 Rasmus, Pontus och Toker (1956) – director: Stig Olin
 Mästerdetektiven Blomkvist lever farligt (1957) – director: Olle Hellbom
 Alla vi barn i Bullerbyn (1960) – director: Olle Hellbom
  (1961) – director: Olle Hellbom
 Vi på Saltkråkan (1964 TV series, 1968 theatrical release) – director: Olle Hellbom
  (1964) – director: Olle Hellbom
  (1965) – director: Olle Hellbom
 Mästerdetektiven Blomkvist på nya äventyr (1966) – director: Etienne Glaser
  (1966) – director: Olle Hellbom
  (1967) – director: Olle Hellbom
 Pippi Långstrump (1969, edited from 1968–69 TV series) – director: Olle Hellbom
 Här kommer Pippi Långstrump (1969, edited from 1968–69 TV series) – director: Olle Hellbom
 På rymmen med Pippi Långstrump (1970) – director: Olle Hellbom
 Pippi Långstrump på de sju haven (1970) – director: Olle Hellbom
 Emil i Lönneberga (1971) – director: Olle Hellbom
 Nya hyss av Emil i Lönneberga (1972) – director: Olle Hellbom
 Emil och griseknoen (1973), Emil and the Piglet – director: Olle Hellbom
 Världens bästa Karlsson (1974) – director: Olle Hellbom
  (1976) – director: Arūnas Žebriūnas
 Bröderna Lejonhjärta (1977) – director: Olle Hellbom
 Du är inte klok, Madicken (1979) – director: Göran Graffman
 Madicken på Junibacken (1980) – director: Göran Graffman
 Rasmus på luffen (1981) – director: Olle Hellbom
 Ronja Rövardotter (1984) – director: Tage Danielsson
 Emīla nedarbi (1985) – director: Varis Brasla
 The Children of Noisy Village (1986) – director: Lasse Hallström
 More About the Children of Noisy Village (1987) – director: Lasse Hallström
 Mio, min Mio (1987) – director: Vladimir Grammatikov
 Kajsa Kavat (1988) – director: Daniel Bergman
 The New Adventures of Pippi Longstocking (1988) – director: Ken Annakin
 Go'natt Herr Luffare (1988) – director: Daniel Bergman
 Allrakäraste syster (1988) – director: Göran Carmback
 Ingen rövare finns i skogen (1988) – director: Göran Carmback
 Gull-Pian (1988) – director: Staffan Götestam
 Hoppa högst (1988) – director: Johanna Hald
 Nånting levande åt Lame-Kal (1988) – director: Magnus Nanne
 Peter och Petra (1989) – director: Agneta Elers-Jarleman
 Nils Karlsson Pyssling (1990) – director: Staffan Götestam
 Pelle flyttar till Komfusenbo (1990) – director: Johanna Hald
 Lotta på Bråkmakargatan (1992) – director: Johanna Hald
 Lotta flyttar hemifrån (1993) – director: Johanna Hald
 Kalle Blomkvist – Mästerdetektiven lever farligt (1996) – director: Göran Carmback
 Kalle Blomkvist och Rasmus (1997) – director: Göran Carmback
 Pippi Longstocking (1997, animated) – director: Clive Smith
 Pippi Longstocking (1997 TV series) (1998, animated) – director: Paul Riley
 Karlsson på taket (2002, animated) – director: Vibeke Idsøe
 Tomte Tummetott and the Fox (2007, animated) – director: Sandra Schießl
 Emil & Ida i Lönneberga (2013, animated) – director: Per Åhlin, Alicja Björk, Lasse Persson
 Sanzoku no Musume Rōnya Japanese TV series (2014–15, animated) – director: Gorō Miyazaki

See also 

 Astrid Lindgren Memorial Award
 Becoming Astrid
 List of Swedish language writers

References 

Sources
 Hagerfors, Anna-Maria (2002), "Astrids sista farväl", Dagens nyheter, 8/3–2002.

Further reading 
 Astrid Lindgren – en levnadsteckning. Margareta Strömstedt. Stockholm, Rabén & Sjögren, 1977.
 Paul Berf, Astrid Surmatz (ed.): Astrid Lindgren. Zum Donnerdrummel! Ein Werk-Porträt. Zweitausendeins, Frankfurt 2000 
 Vivi Edström: Astrid Lindgren. Im Land der Märchen und Abenteuer. Oetinger, Hamburg 1997 
 Maren Gottschalk: Jenseits von Bullerbü. Die Lebensgeschichte der Astrid Lindgren. Beltz & Gelberg, Weinheim 2006 
 Jörg Knobloch (ed.): Praxis Lesen: Astrid Lindgren: A4-Arbeitsvorlagen Klasse 2–6, AOL-Verlag, Lichtenau 2002 
 Sybil Gräfin Schönfeldt: Astrid Lindgren. 10. ed., Rowohlt, Reinbek 2000 
 Margareta Strömstedt: Astrid Lindgren. Ein Lebensbild. Oetinger, Hamburg 2001 
 Astrid Surmatz: Pippi Långstrump als Paradigma. Die deutsche Rezeption Astrid Lindgrens und ihr internationaler Kontext. Francke, Tübingen, Basel 2005 
 Metcalf, Eva-Maria: Astrid Lindgren. New York, Twayne, 1995

External links 

 AstridLindgren.se – official site produced by license holders
 
 Astrid Lindgren's World – official site of the theme park
 Astrid Lindgrens Näs – official site produced by the Astrid Lindgren-museum and culture center Astrid Lindgrens Näs in Vimmerby
 Astrid Lindgren – Right Livelihood Award (1994)
 Astrid Lindgren – fan site
 
 Astrid spacecraft description at NASA Space Science Data Coordinated Archive
 Astrid Lindgren – profile at FamousAuthors.org
 

 
1907 births
2002 deaths
20th-century Swedish screenwriters
20th-century Swedish novelists
20th-century Swedish women writers
Animal welfare workers
Children's rights activists
Children's songwriters
Hans Christian Andersen Award for Writing winners
Litteris et Artibus recipients
Memory of the World Register
People from Vimmerby Municipality
Recipients of the Illis quorum
Selma Lagerlöf Prize winners
Sommar (radio program) hosts
Swedish women radio presenters
Swedish children's writers
Swedish eurosceptics
Swedish fantasy writers
Swedish pacifists
Swedish satirists
Swedish Social Democratic Party
Swedish women children's writers
Swedish women screenwriters
Swedish-language writers
Women science fiction and fantasy writers
Writers from Småland